The 2020–21 Liga Premier de México season is the third-tier football league of Mexico. The tournament began on 18 September 2020 and finished on 16 May 2021.

Changes from the previous season
 UNAM Premier has discontinued their participation in Serie A to participate in the new Liga de Expansión MX.
 Atlético Bahía, Atlético Reynosa, Atlético San Francisco, Calor, Coras de Nayarit, Deportivo Nuevo Chimalhuacán, La Paz, Murciélagos, Sporting Canamy, UACH and Yalmakán were put on hiatus for the 2020–21 season due to financial issues due to COVID-19.
 Cafetaleros de Chiapas Premier renamed to Cafetaleros de Chiapas, will stay in Chiapas and will become their Primary Team after their Ascenso MX Team moved to Cancun.
 Tepatitlán and Tlaxcala have been certified and promoted to the Liga de Expansión MX, while Atlético Reynosa did not get certified due to stadium issues.
 Colima F.C. and Mazorqueros F.C. joins in Serie A as expansion teams.
 Aguacateros CDU, Ciervos, Cuautla, Dongu and Zitácuaro joins in Serie A as expansion teams from Serie B.
 Real Zamora returns from hiatus but they were relocated and renamed as Azores de Hidalgo.
 Héroes de Zací tried to join in Serie A after being approved after a one-year hold due to stadium requirements were not met. However, to meet the requirements, the team was relocated to Acámbaro, Guanajuato, in addition, the franchise was rented to another administration other than the owners. However, the team was subsequently not approved to participate in the season.
 Atlético Irapuato was renamed as C.D. Irapuato due to changes in club ownership.
 Chapulineros de Oaxaca will decline their Liga Premier participation for 2020–21 season to participate in the Liga de Balompié Mexicano after one year return from hiatus.
 Correcaminos UAT Premier, Deportivo CAFESSA Tlajomulco, Dorados de Sinaloa Premier, Mineros de Zacatecas Premier and Real Canamy Tlayacapan have dissolved.
 On January 23, 2021 Azores de Hidalgo was relocated and renamed as Inter de Querétaro, however, officially the team continued to be registered as Azores de Hidalgo for the rest of the season.

Group 1

Stadiums and locations

Standings

Positions by Round

Results

Group 2

Stadium and locations
{{Location map+ |Mexico |width=650|float=right |caption=Location of teams in the 2020–21 Serie A Group 2 |places=

Standings

Positions by Round

Results

Regular Season statistics

Top goalscorers 
Players sorted first by goals scored, then by last name.
{|class="wikitable"
|-
! Rank
! Player
! Club
! Goals
|-
|align=center rowspan=1|1
| Daniel Delgadillo
|Cafetaleros de Chiapas|align=center rowspan=1|22'|-
|align=center rowspan=1|2
| Marco Granados
|Irapuato
|align=center rowspan=1|18
|-
|align=center rowspan=1|3
| Brandon Rosas
|Pioneros de Cancún
|align=center rowspan=1|17
|-
|align=center rowspan=1|4
| Brian Martínez
|Cruz Azul Hidalgo
|align=center rowspan=1|16
|-
|align=center rowspan=1|5
| Luis Miguel Franco
|La Piedad
|align=center rowspan=1|15
|-
|align=center rowspan=2|6
| Alberto García
|Irapuato
|align=center rowspan=2|12
|-
| William Guzmán
|Alacranes de Durango
|-
|align=center rowspan=2|8
| Luis Fernando Cruz
|Colima
|align=center rowspan=2|11
|-
| Raúl Suárez
|Inter Playa del Carmen
|-
|align=center rowspan=3|10
| Erick Bustos
|Cruz Azul Hidalgo
|align=center rowspan=3|9
|-
| Diego González
|La Piedad
|-
| Juan Carlos Peña
|Aguacateros CDU
|-
|}
Source:Liga Premier FMF

 Hat-tricks 

(H) – Home ; (A) – Away

 Coefficient table 

Last updated: April 11, 2021 Source: Liga Premier FMFP = Position; G = Games played; Pts = Points; Pts/G = Ratio of points to games played; GD = Goal difference 

Attendance

Highest and lowest

Source: Liga Premier FMF

 Liguilla 
The four best teams of each group play two games against each other on a home-and-away basis. The higher seeded teams play on their home field during the second leg. The winner of each match up is determined by aggregate score. In the quarterfinals and semifinals, if the two teams are tied on aggregate the higher seeded team advances. In the final, if the two teams are tied after both legs, the match goes to extra time and, if necessary, a penalty shoot-out.

 Quarter-finals 
The first legs were played on 17 and 18 April, and the second legs were played on 23 and 24 April 2021.All times are UTC−5 First leg 

 Second leg 

 Semi-finals 
The first legs were played on 29 April, and the second legs were played on 2 May 2021.All times are UTC−5 First leg 

 Second leg 

Final
The first leg was played on 9 May, and the second leg was played on 16 May 2021.All times are UTC−5''

First leg

Second leg

See also 
2020–21 Liga MX season
2020–21 Liga de Expansión MX season
2020–21 Liga TDP season

References

External links
 Official website of Liga Premier FMF

1